Mokokchung (Pron: /ˌməʊkɒkˈtʃʌŋ/) is a municipality in the Mokokchung District of Nagaland, India. It serves as the district headquarters as well as the main urban hub of Mokokchung District. Mokokchung is the cultural nerve centre of the Ao people and is economically and politically the most important urban centre in northern Nagaland. The town is made up of 16 wards of which Kumlong, Sangtemla, Alempang and Yimyu are the largest.

History
Historically, Mokokchung was one of the first Naga Hills sites where the Assam Rifles, led by Britishers, established their outposts (then called stockades) in the later part of the 19th century. Much of the town initially grew around this post located in the DC Hill. The British administration was then gradually extended eastwards towards the remoter parts of the Naga Hills.

1994 Mokokchung Massacre 

Also referred to as Ayatai Mokokchung by the citizens of the town. The incident took place on 27 December 1994, when forces of the 10th Assam Rifles and the 12th Maratha Light Infantry of the Indian Army raided upon the civilian populace of Mokokchung. The incident lasted for about 2 hours and left 89 shops, 48 houses, 17 vehicles and 7 two-wheelers razed to ashes, excluding those destroyed by gunfire and shelling. 7 civilians were gunned down, another 5 burned alive including a child, several women raped and more than a dozen gone missing.

Geography
It is located at an elevation of 1325 metres above sea level.

Mokokchung has a mild climate throughout the year. For ten months of the year, maximum temperature hovers in the mid twenties. Mokokchung also witnesses a lot of mist in the rainy months.

Demographics
As of 2001 census of India, the population under Mokokchung Municipal Council (excluding the colonies beyond Sungkomen Ward) had a population of 31,204. The actual population is 41,746 (including Yimyu ward which was incorporated into Mokokchung proper in 2003, i.e. after the last census in 2001). Its metropolitan agglomeration has a population of 60,161. Males constitute 55% of the population and females 45%. Mokokchung has the highest literacy rate in the state with an average literacy rate of 84%, far above the national average of 59.5%: male literacy is 84%, and female literacy is 83%. 11% of the population is under 6 years of age.

The population is predominantly Ao, as the town is the heart and the cultural centre of the Aos. The town is redolent with their history and cultural practices.

Suburbs

Mokokchung lies at the centre of the urban areas of Mokokchung district, a series of settlements from Alichen in the south, through Mokokchung town up to Amenyong and Khensa in the North West; and from Mokokchung town through Fazl Ali College up to DEF colony in the North East.

The trend of sub urbanization in Mokokchung (which had started in Western countries in the sixties) started in the eighties with the mushrooming of satellite towns like Yimyu and Marepkong. Today, the urban settlement has spilled outside the historical boundary of Mokokchung town. This trend has speeded up (since the late nineties) so much so that the erstwhile satellite town of Yimyu boomed and spread towards Mokokchung and became conjoined with it. Today it has become a ward of Mokokchung. As a result of this flight to the suburbs, population growth in Mokokchung town (the area under the municipality comprising the fifteen wards) has slowed down while the satellite towns are booming.

So far the villages of Chuchuyimpang, Mokokchung Village, Khensa and Ungma have acquired urban characteristics and been engulfed by the urban spread of Mokokchung. Although not part of the municipality, they have become very much a part of Mokokchung and are confused by many tourists as being localities of the town.

People are now living miles away from the main town in smaller suburbs as well as villages, who drive to work daily to the main town.

Culture

Religion
In addition to Christianity, the other religions and faiths practiced in Mokokchung - mainly by immigrant business community from Mainland India - are Hinduism, Sikhism and Islam.

Media
 Mokokchung Times (daily newspaper in English)
 Lenjeter (monthly magazine in Ao)
 Tir Yimyim (daily newspaper in Ao)

The various satellite cable TV network provider also runs local channels of their own.

Politics
Mokokchung has political importance in Nagaland. Apart from Mokokchung town constituency, parts of the town fall under three other state assembly constituencies—namely, Aonglenden and Mongoya—thus making the town the deciding factor in 3 of 60 assembly seats in the state legislature. Leaders from the town played a major role in brokering a deal with the Government of India at the height of the Indo-Naga conflict in the 1950s, resulting in the formation of Nagaland state as the 16th state of India in 1963.

Over the last two decades, Mokokchung has become a stronghold of the Indian National Congress party which can be partly attributed to the fact that the party was led by S. Chubatoshi Jamir whose constituency was Aonglenden. In the 2003 general Assembly elections, Indian National Congress won Aonglenden, Mongoya and Mokokchung town constituencies while Koridang constituency was won by an Independent candidate.

Notable political leaders:
 P. Shilu Ao, the first Chief Minister of Nagaland
 S. C. Jamir, the longest-serving Chief Minister of Nagaland and the former governor of the States of Goa, Maharashtra and Odisha.
 T Aliba Imti, a former Member of Parliament (Rajya Sabha) and the first president of the Naga National Council (NNC)
 N. I. Jamir, Former Chief Secretary of Nagaland and Minister
 K. Asungba Sangtam, two time former Member of Parliament (Lok Sabha)
 C. Apok Jamir, former Member of Parliament (Rajya Sabha) and Former Member of Legislative Assembly from Aonglenden constituency
 Supongmeren, former Member of Legislative Assembly from Mongoya constituency
T. Sentichuba, present Member of Legislative Assembly from Angetyongpang constituency
 Dr. Ngangshi K. Ao, present Member of Legislative Assembly from Mongoya constituency

Sports
Football, volleyball, basketball, badminton and cricket are the most popular sports in Mokokchung. The town has two basketball courts, two football fields, one badminton stadium, and one cricket field.

Education
Schools
 Queen Mary Higher Secondary School
 Mayangnokcha Higher Secondary School (MGHSS)
 Jubilee Memorial Higher Secondary School
 Edith Douglas Higher Secondary School
 Lady Bird Higher Secondary School
 Hill View Higher Secondary School
 Model Higher Secondary School
 Town Higher Secondary School
 Canaan Christian Higher Secondary School
 Assam Rifles High School
 Hills Night High School
 Children School
Nagaland Christian Residential School (NCRS)

Universities and Colleges
Fazl Ali College
Jubilee Memorial College (estd. 2015)
 People's College
 College of Teachers Education
 Institute of Communication & Information Technology 
 Industrial Training Institute
 National Institute of Electronics and Information Technology Extension Centre, Chuchuyimlang

Transportation
Mokokchung's central location has helped it to be the converging point of maximum number of highways and hence it is better connected to most areas of Nagaland when compared to Kohima and Dimapur. Besides, every village and settlement of the district is well linked to the town by district and community roads.

Major Highways that pass through Mokokchung are:

 NH 2 (Dibrugarh–Mokokchung–Kohima–Imphal–Churachandpur–Seling–Tuipang)
 NH 202 (Mokokchung–Tuensang–Jessami–Imphal)
 NH 702D Mokokchung–Mariani–Jorhat Highway
 Mokokchung–Chare
 Mokokchung–Noksen

References

 
Cities and towns in Mokokchung district
Hill stations in Nagaland